Dəliməmmədli is a city in the Goranboy District of Azerbaijan. It has a population of 5,513. The municipality consists of the city of Dəliməmmədli and Sarovlu.

References

Populated places in Goranboy District